Lourdoueix-Saint-Pierre is a commune in the Creuse department in the Nouvelle-Aquitaine region in central France.

Geography
The Petite Creuse river forms much of the south-western boundary of the commune's territory, whilst to the north lies the department of Indre.

Population

Sights
 The church of St. Pierre, dating from the fifteenth century.
 A menhir.
 Traces of a Roman settlement called the "Fossé de Châtres".
 The fourteenth-century castle at the hamlet of Vost, rebuilt in the nineteenth century.
 The chapel at Lignaud, dating from the thirteenth century.

See also
Communes of the Creuse department

References

Communes of Creuse